List of £5 banknotes and coins, include:

Current currencies
Sterling:
British £5 coin
Bank of England £5 note
Bank of Scotland £5 note 
Bank of Ireland £5 note
Clydesdale Bank £5 note
Royal Bank of Scotland £5 note
Ulster Bank £5 note
Egyptian LE 5 note
Falklands £5 note
Gibraltarian £5 note
Guernsey £5 note
Manx £5 note
Jersey £5 note
Saint Helena £5 note
South Sudanese £5 SSP note
Sudanese LS 5 note
Syrian LS 5 coin

Obsolete currencies
Australian £A 5 note
Bahamian £5 note
Bermudian £5 note
Biafran £5 note
British West African 100/– note
Canadian £5 note
Cypriot £C 5 note
Fijian £5 note
Gambian £5 note
Ghanaian £5 note
Irish pound
Series A IR£5 note
Series B IR£5 note
Series C IR£5 note
Israeli IL5 note and coin
Jamaican £5 note
Libyan £L5 note
Maltese £M 5 note
New Brunswick £5 note
New Zealand £NZ 5 note
Nigerian £5 note
Nova Scotian £5 note
Palestianian £P5 note
Prince Edward Island £5 note
Rhodesia and Nyasaland £5 note
Rhodesian £5 note
Southern Rhodesian £5 note
Malawian £5 note
Zambian £5 note
Solomon Islands £5 note
South African £SA 5 note
South West African £5 note
Tongan £5 note
Western Samoan £5 note

See also
 List of £1
 List of £10

Currency
Numismatics